The Texarkana Bears minor league baseball team played in the East Texas League in 1947 and the Big State League from 1947 to 1953. It was based in the American city of Texarkana, Texas. It was affiliated with the Chicago White Sox in 1946.

In 1947, under manager George Washington, the club won the Big State League championships. It again won the championship in 1950, under manager George Archie.

Major league alumni

Vicente Amor
Red Borom
Frank Carswell
Buzz Dozier
Vallie Eaves
Al Gerheauser
Len Gilmore
Warren Hacker
Joe Kracher
George Milstead
Prince Oana
Jennings Poindexter
Pete Runnels
Pat Scantlebury
Floyd Speer
Joe Szekely
George Washington
Ray Yochim
Tony York

References

Texarkana, Texas
Defunct minor league baseball teams
Defunct baseball teams in Texas
Professional baseball teams in Texas
Baseball teams established in 1946
1946 establishments in Texas
1953 disestablishments in Texas
Defunct Big State League teams
Chicago White Sox minor league affiliates
Baseball teams disestablished in 1953
East Texas League teams